Ansa or Ansia   (died after 774)  was a Queen of the Lombards by marriage to Desiderius (756–774), King of the Lombards.

Life
She belonged to an aristocratic family of Brescia. The Latin name does not imply a Romano-Italic origin, as Romans and Lombards in the eighth century tended to take either Lombard or Latin names. She was probably a Lombard, the daughter of Verissimo and sister of King Hildeprand, Arechis, and Donnolo, and niece of King Liutprand.

In or around 753, she founded the monastery of St. Michele and St. Pietro at Brescia.
Her husband meanwhile, had become a royal officer and the couple moved first to the royal court, and then to Tuscany, when Desiderius became 'Duke of Tuscia'. After the death of King Aistulf, Desiderius managed to take the throne and Ansa become queen, actively collaborating with her husband, especially in religious matters. 
In Brescia, she expanded the previously founded monastery, which became the Monastery of San Salvatore, endowed it with exceptional wealth and made her daughter Anselperga the abbess. The jurisdiction of San Salvatore subjugated an entire network of monasteries in Lombardy, Emilia and Tuscany, creating a federation directly controlled by the sovereign,  such as the monastery of San Felice in Pavia, founded in 760 by her husband Desiderius.

After 759, she appeared frequently in Desiderius' diplomas and was probably the architect of his religious policy.

On 5 June 774, she was presented along with her husband to Charlemagne, who had conquered Pavia. Paul the Deacon wrote an Epitaphium Ansae reginae praising her politics, her piety, and her beauty: coniunx pulcherrima, "most beautiful wife" was certainly active in the political and presumably contributed to the marriage policy that made the Lombard monarchy a major European power.

After the fall of the Lombard kingdom, caused by Charlemagne, Ansa was locked up with her husband and daughter without a name, maybe Desiderata, at a monastery of the Carolingian Empire, in Liège or Corbie. A local tradition, however, states that she was buried in the monastery she founded; so it is possible that, after the death of her husband, Ansa, then elderly, received permission to retire to Italy.

Issue

Her children with Desiderius were a son and four daughters:
Anselperga (or Anselberga), abbess of San Salvatore
Adelperga (or Adelberga), married Arechis II of Benevento 
Liutperga (also Liutpirc or Liutberga), married Tassilo III of Bavaria 
Desiderata or Ermengarda, married Charlemagne in 768, divorced in 771 
Adelchis (or Adalgis), patrician in Constantinople King Adelkis, son King Poto, dynasty Poto Pothos or Desiderius (Dynasty Puoti, Poto of Castelpoto) Fonte :Dei Regni d'Italia sotto i Barbari Epitome di Thesauro.

Cultural references
Alessandro Manzoni wrote the tragedy Adelchi about her son in 1822.
King Adelkis, son King Poto, dynasty Poto Pothos or Desiderius(Dynasty  Puoti, Poto of Castelpoto)

References

Bibliography

Sources
Ghisalberti, Alberto M. Dizionario Biografico degli Italiani: III Ammirato – Arcoleo. Rome, 1961.

Lombardic queens consort
8th-century Lombard people
8th-century Italian women